André Giroux (December 10, 1916 – July 28, 1977) was a Canadian writer of fiction. Giroux authored Malgré tout, la joie, a series of short stories for which he received the Governor General's Award for French Canadian literature in 1959, as presented by the Canada Council. He was also a Montyon Prize winner.

Giroux was born in Quebec City, Quebec. A member of the Royal Society of Canada, he died following an automobile accident on July 24, 1977.

List of literary works
Au-delà des visages / Beyond the Faces (1948 novel)
Le gouffre a toujours soif / The Bottomless Pit (1953 novel)
14, rue de Galais / 14 Galais street (television series, 1954–57)
Malgré tout, la joie / Despite Everything, the Joy! (1958) — Winner, 1959 Governor General's Awards

André Giroux also authored articles in newspapers under the pseudonym Rene de Villers.

Biographies
Analytical Bibliography of Andre Giroux, Yvette Giroux, 1949 
Andre Giroux - the writer, the man, the poet, Mado of Isle, the Editions Arion, 1994

Awards and honours
1949 - Montyon Prize of the French Academy
1950 - Province of Quebec Prize
1952 - Guggenheim Fellowship
1959 - Governor General's Award for French language fiction

External links
CyberScol: Quebec literature
Guide to Literary Archives: André Giroux provided by Library and Archives Canada
 Archives of Andr Giroux (Fonds André Giroux, R11742) are held at Library and Archives Canada

1916 births
1977 deaths
Canadian male novelists
Writers from Quebec City
Governor General's Award-winning fiction writers
20th-century Canadian novelists
Canadian novelists in French
20th-century Canadian male writers
Montyon Prize laureates